David M. Viti (born September 28, 1939) was a Canadian football player who played for the Hamilton Tiger-Cats, mostly as a wide receiver but also as a defensive back. He won the Grey Cup with the Tiger-Cats in 1963, 1965 and 1967. From 1962 to 1969, Viti caught 84 passes for	1237 yards and a 14.7 yard per catch average, his best year being 1963 with 27 catches. From 1963 to 1969, he played all 14 regular season games except 2 in 1964. He played college football at Boston University.

References

1939 births
Sportspeople from Providence, Rhode Island
Players of American football from Providence, Rhode Island
Hamilton Tiger-Cats players
Living people